Allothrissops is an extinct genus of bulldog fish.

References 

Prehistoric ray-finned fish genera
Ichthyodectiformes